Michael Zank is a German-born American author, specializing in Jewish theology and philosophy.

Work and career
He studied Christian and Jewish theology in Germany before moving to the United States, after spending  a short time in Israel. He received his PhD in Near Eastern and Judaic Studies at Brandeis University. He now works there as the Director of Undergraduate Studies for the Religion Department and teaches introductory level courses on the Bible, Moses and Jerusalem as well as advanced courses in the philosophy of religion. He is considered to be a leading expert in German Jewish intellectual history. In his spare time, he reflects on the works of Hermann Cohen, Martin Buber, Franz Rosenzweig and Leo Strauss. He has spent about two years in Jerusalem since 1992 and is interested in the combination of spirituality and violence the city has displayed. He currently maintains a few websites such as, "Jerusalem in Time" and "Unholycity.blogspot.com". In fall 2010 he started three new courses at the Undergraduate Studies for the Religion Department (The Modern Jew, The Political Jew, and The Heretical Jew). He plans to write about the aftermath of the Holocaust in the German public mind for a more personal piece in the future.

Published work

Book
 The Idea of Atonement in the Philosophy of Hermann Cohen, Brown Judaic Studies (2000)

Essays and articles
 The Rosenzweig-Rosenstock Triangle, or What Can We Learn from Letters to Gritli?: A Review Essay
 Von Gott reden im Land der Tater: Theologische Stimmen der dritten Generation seit der Shoah, and: Parables for Our Time: Rereading New Testament Scholarship after the Holocaust" (review)
 Holy City: “Jerusalem in Time, Space, and the Imagination” in Transformations.

EditedNew Perspectives on Martin Buber, Mohr Siebeck (2006)  Leo Strauss : The Early Writings, 1921-1932'', State University of New York Press (2002)

References 

Living people
Continental philosophers
Philosophers of religion
Year of birth missing (living people)